The rufous coucal (Centropus unirufus) is a species of cuckoo in the family Cuculidae.
It is found in Luzon and proximate islands in the Philippines.

Its natural habitat is subtropical or tropical moist lowland forest.
It is threatened by habitat loss.

References

rufous coucal
Birds of Luzon
rufous coucal
Taxonomy articles created by Polbot